Tamara D. Grigsby (November 19, 1974 – March 14, 2016) was an American social worker, academic, and politician who served as a member of the Wisconsin State Assembly by representing the 18th Assembly District from 2005 until 2013.

Early life and education
Born in Pullman, Washington, Grigsby graduated from James Madison Memorial High School in Madison, Wisconsin. She received her bachelor's degree from Howard University and received her master's degree from University of Wisconsin–Madison in social work.

Career 
Grigsby taught at University of Wisconsin–Milwaukee, Carroll University, and Cardinal Stritch University and was a social worker and family counselor.

Grigsby was first elected to the Assembly in 2004 to succeed fellow Democrat Lena Taylor, winning the September Democratic primary election by an absolute majority (3,231 votes to 1,820 for her two opponents), and facing no opposition in the general election. She was assigned to the standing committees on children and families; criminal justice and homeland security; on public health; and on tourism. 2008 and 2010.

Illness and death
Grigsby's staff announced on December 22, 2011, that she was hospitalized in intensive care, battling cancer. In April 2012, Grigsby announced she would be retiring from the Assembly to recover her strength. She died on March 14, 2016, in Madison, Wisconsin.

References

External links
 
Campaign 2010 campaign contributions at Wisconsin Democracy Campaign

1974 births
2016 deaths
American social workers
Howard University alumni
Democratic Party members of the Wisconsin State Assembly
People from Pullman, Washington
Politicians from Madison, Wisconsin
Politicians from Milwaukee
University of Wisconsin-Madison School of Social Work alumni
University of Wisconsin–Milwaukee faculty
Cardinal Stritch University faculty
Carroll University faculty
Women state legislators in Wisconsin
21st-century American politicians
21st-century American women politicians
American women academics